The 2005–06 season was Colchester United's 64th season in their history and their eighth successive season in the third tier of English football, League One. Alongside competing in League One, the club also participated in the FA Cup, the League Cup and the Football League Trophy.

The season was hugely successful for the U's as they achieved their first-ever promotion to the second tier of English football by finishing second in League One. They finished runners-up to Essex derby rivals Southend United by three points. Southend were successful in beating Colchester home and away across the season.

Colchester had another long set of cup runs, reaching the fifth round of the FA Cup where they were defeated 3–1 by Premier League champions Chelsea at Stamford Bridge. They had beaten Leamington, Shrewsbury Town, Sheffield United and Derby County en route to the tie with Chelsea. They also embarked on a Football League Trophy run, once more reaching the area final but lost 3–1 on aggregate to eventual winners Swansea City.

Season overview
Colchester started the new season poorly. At the end of August after six games, they found themselves in the relegation zone with one win and two draws. Phil Parkinson had made a number of changes to his playing staff over the summer with numerous outgoings. He had signed Chris Iwelumo from Alemannia Aachen on a permanent basis and brought in Mark Yeates on loan from Tottenham Hotspur. It wasn't until Jamie Cureton arrived on loan from Swindon Town that the U's had an upturn in form as they earned five consecutive wins and went eight matches unbeaten.

By Christmas, Colchester were in the top four but their unbeaten run was ended by Swindon on Boxing Day. They recovered from this setback to embark on another winning streak, earning seven wins on the bounce, ten matches including cup ties and sat top of the table by the end of January. Their form fell away in mid February and through March into April when they picked up just one win in 10 games, dropping from the automatic promotion places to the play-off spots.

Meanwhile, in the FA Cup, Colchester had progressed to the fifth round to set up a tie with Premier League champions Chelsea at Stamford Bridge. The club equalled a 44-year-old record by beating Leamington 9–1 in the first round, and then saw off the challenge of Shrewsbury Town, and then Championship sides Sheffield United and Derby County.

José Mourinho's Chelsea side had been assembled for around £225m, while Colchester United's squad had a value of approximately £150,000. More than 6,000 U's fans travelled to the game and were given an early treat when the underdogs took the lead through a Ricardo Carvalho own goal in the 28th minute. Paulo Ferreira equalised ten minutes later as the sides went into half time with the score level. At half time, Mourinho made two changes, introducing star players Frank Lampard and Joe Cole. He then sent on Hernán Crespo with the score still level up until the 79th minute when Cole struck to give Chelsea the lead. He added a second in the final minute of the game to hand the hosts a 3–1 victory.

The U's again reached the area final of the Football League Trophy, but lost over two legs to eventual winners Swansea City.

In the closing stages of the season, Colchester returned to winning ways and to the automatic promotion places with four games remaining. Wins against AFC Bournemouth and Rotherham United meant United only had to secure a draw in their final game of the season at Yeovil Town. The U's nervously held on to a 0–0 draw to gain promotion to the Championship, finishing the campaign behind leaders and rivals Southend United. Southend had beaten Colchester twice over the course of the season as they finished three points shy of the title.

Players

Transfers

In

 Total spending:  ~ £0

Out

 Total incoming:  ~ £0

Loans in

Loans out

Match details

League One

League table

Results round by round

Matches

Football League Cup

FA Cup

Football League Trophy

Squad statistics

Appearances and goals

|-
!colspan="16"|Players who appeared for Colchester who left during the season

|}

Goalscorers

Disciplinary record

Clean sheets
Number of games goalkeepers kept a clean sheet.

Player debuts
Players making their first-team Colchester United debut in a fully competitive match.

See also
List of Colchester United F.C. seasons

References

General
Books

Websites

Specific

2005-06
2005–06 Football League One by team